The  is a limited express train service in Japan operated by JR Shikoku which runs from  to .

Route
The main stations served by this service are as follows.

 -  -  -

Rolling stock

 8000 series 5-, or 8-car tilting EMUs (Okayama - Matsuyama services, coupled with Ishizuchi services)
 8600 series 5-, 7-, or 8-car tilting EMUs

Past rolling stock

 KiHa 181 series DMUs (1972–1993)
 KiHa 185 series DMUs (1986–1990)
 2000 series tilting DMUs (1990–2016)

History
 1972: Shiokaze services start between Takamatsu and Uwajima and between Takamatsu and Matsuyama.
 1986: KiHa 185 series DMUs introduced, and Shiokaze becomes L Tokkyū service.
 November 1990: 2000 series tilting DMUs introduced.
 July 1992: 8000 series tilting EMUs introduced.
 15 March 2008: All cars made no-smoking.
 26 March 2016: 8600 series tilting EMUs to be introduced on four daily round-trip services. 2000 series trains will be withdrawn.

References

 JR Timetable, August 2008 issue
 "ＪＲ新幹線＆特急列車ファイル" (JR Shinkansen & Limited Express Train File), published 2008 by Kōtsū Shimbun

External links

 JR Shikoku Train Information 

Named passenger trains of Japan
Shikoku Railway Company
Railway services introduced in 1972